Broadmoor is a census-designated place (CDP) in an unincorporated area of San Mateo County, California, United States.  The enclave is entirely surrounded by Daly City.  The population was 4,176 at the 2010 census.

Geography
Broadmoor is located at  (37.692433, -122.478901).

According to the United States Census Bureau, the CDP has a total area of 0.432 square miles, all of it land.

Demographics

2020
Broadmoor's population in 2020 was reported as 4,411. The population density was 10,210.6 inhabitants per square mile (3,942.3/km). The racial makeup of the CDP was 1,206 (27.3%) White, 77 (6.4%) Black or African American, 43 (1.0%) American Indian and Alaska Native, 2,084 (47.2%) Asian, 38 (0.9%) Native Hawaiian and Other Pacific Islander, 466 (10.6%) Some Other Race, and 497 (11.3%) two or more races. The largest mixed-race groups were White and Some Other Race (271, 6.1%) and White and Asian (102, 2.3%). 982 residents (22.3%) were Hispanic or Latino (of any race). Among the residents who were not Hispanic or Latino, 1,060 were White, 65 were Black or African American, 14 were American Indian and Alaska Native, 2,061 were Asian, 34 were Native Hawaiians or other Pacific Islanders, 25 were Some Other Race, and 170 were of two or more races. Among Hispanic and Latino residents, 146 identified their race as White, 12 Black or African American, 29 American Indian and Alaska Native, 23 Asian, 4 Native Hawaiian and Other Pacific Islander, 441 Some Other Race, and 327 two or more races. 250 Hispanic or Latino residents identified their race as both White and Some Other Race.

There were 1464 housing units, of which 1427 were occupied and 37 were vacant.

3,658 people (82.9%) were 18 years old or older, while 753 (17.1%) were younger than 18 years old.

65 people (1.5%) were living in group quarters, including 20 in nursing facilities and 45 in other facilities.

2010
At the 2010 census Broadmoor had a population of 4,176. The racial makeup of Broadmoor was 1,705 (40.8%) White, 100 (2.4%) African American, 30 (0.7%) Native American, 1,676 (40.1%) Asian, 44 (1.1%) Pacific Islander, 359 (8.6%) from other races, and 262 (6.3%) from two or more races. Hispanic or Latino of any race were 981 people (23.5%).

The census reported that 4,076 people (97.6% of the population) lived in households, 68 (1.6%) lived in non-institutionalized group quarters, and 32 (0.8%) were institutionalized.

There were 1,349 households, 461 (34.2%) had children under the age of 18 living in them, 782 (58.0%) were opposite-sex married couples living together, 163 (12.1%) had a female householder with no husband present, 80 (5.9%) had a male householder with no wife present.  There were 64 (4.7%) unmarried opposite-sex partnerships, and 12 (0.9%) same-sex married couples or partnerships. 227 households (16.8%) were one person and 110 (8.2%) had someone living alone who was 65 or older. The average household size was 3.02.  There were 1,025 families (76.0% of households); the average family size was 3.40.

The age distribution was 854 people (20.5%) under the age of 18, 345 people (8.3%) aged 18 to 24, 1,095 people (26.2%) aged 25 to 44, 1,228 people (29.4%) aged 45 to 64, and 654 people (15.7%) who were 65 or older.  The median age was 41.7 years. For every 100 females, there were 95.9 males.  For every 100 females age 18 and over, there were 93.9 males.

There were 1,392 housing units at an average density of 3,092.3 per square mile, of the occupied units 1,037 (76.9%) were owner-occupied and 312 (23.1%) were rented. The homeowner vacancy rate was 0.7%; the rental vacancy rate was 1.9%.  2,981 people (71.4% of the population) lived in owner-occupied housing units and 1,095 people (26.2%) lived in rental housing units.

2000
At the 2000 census there were 4,026 people, 1,275 households, and 984 families in the CDP. The racial makeup of the CDP in 2010 was 30.7% non-Hispanic White, 2.0% non-Hispanic African American, 0.2% Native American, 39.1% Asian, 1.0% Pacific Islander, 0.3% from other races, and 3.3% from two or more races. Hispanic or Latino of any race were 23.5%.

Of the 1,275 households 34.9% had children under the age of 18 living with them, 60.0% were married couples living together, 13.0% had a female householder with no husband present, and 22.8% were non-families. 16.2% of households were one person and 8.6% were one person aged 65 or older.  The average household size was 3.11 and the average family size was 3.48.

The age distribution was 23.2% under the age of 18, 7.4% from 18 to 24, 27.6% from 25 to 44, 26.7% from 45 to 64, and 15.1% 65 or older.  The median age was 40 years. For every 100 females, there were 93.2 males.  For every 100 females age 18 and over, there were 90.0 males.

The median household income was $69,836 and the median family income  was $71,250. Males had a median income of $47,700 versus $37,784 for females. The per capita income for the CDP was $24,608.  About 3.9% of families and 5.1% of the population were below the poverty line, including 4.8% of those under age 18 and 5.1% of those age 65 or over.

History
The farms that had long graced the area started to give way to suburban housing developments from the 1940s onwards. The residents of Broadmoor, rallying around their police protection district and their sense of identity as a separate community, have been mostly successful in fighting off annexation by Daly City, despite losing slices of their community's territory, including its police headquarters, in the many piecemeal annexations which over the years saw Daly City gradually encircle Broadmoor in its entirety.  Daly City's attempts to annex the enclave and Broadmoor residents' resistance to those efforts have led to strained relations between the two entities at times.

Public Safety
A special property tax assessment funds the Broadmoor Police Department, which was founded in 1948 after residents grew concerned of long response times from the San Mateo County Sheriff's Department—most of whose deputies are based in the southern end of the county. The Broadmoor Police Protection District is governed by a Police Commission, the Broadmoor Police Protection District Board of Police Commissioners, which consists of three residents elected at large every four years. In 2007 State Senator Leland Yee (California's Eighth District) authored legislation sponsored by the Broadmoor Police Department to recognize Broadmoor as a municipal or city police department.  Senate Bill 230, which was signed by Governor Schwarzenegger, provides Broadmoor Police with the same legal recognition and status of a city or municipal police department. The Broadmoor Police Department is staffed by eight full-time police officers, including the chief of police, and twenty-five part-time police officers.

As of 2021, an investigation of retirement fraud and misuse of public funds by former top employees of the District is ongoing.
The former police chief, Michael Connolly, was sentenced to probation for conflict-of-interest charges.

Fire protection is provided by the Colma Fire Protection District.  The Colma Fire Protection District also provides 24 hr paramedic (ALS) coverage 365 days a year. It is staffed with one paramedic at all times.

Government

References

External links
 Gateway to the Peninsula by Samuel C. Chandler, Daly City, CA: The City of Daly City, 1973. Chapter 25: "Broadmoor".
 "Tiny community may finally get police powers" by John Coté, San Francisco Chronicle, July 30, 2007.

Census-designated places in San Mateo County, California
Census-designated places in California
Enclaves in the United States
Unincorporated communities in San Mateo County, California